Armin Baumgartner (born 8 March 1950) is a Swiss bobsledder. He competed in the four man event at the 1980 Winter Olympics.

References

1950 births
Living people
Swiss male bobsledders
Olympic bobsledders of Switzerland
Bobsledders at the 1980 Winter Olympics
Place of birth missing (living people)
20th-century Swiss people